The Jamestown S'Klallam Tribe is a federally recognized tribe of S'Klallam or Klallam Native Americans. They are on the northern Olympic Peninsula of Washington state in the northwestern United States.

History
This was a notable feat, since at the time Native people were legally barred from buying property. Despite periodic pressures to relocate to reservations, and without the Federal financial assistance that such relocation would have enabled, the Jamestown band maintained its independent community, and developed a viable economic base.

A century later, after a six-year effort to receive official recognition as a tribe, the United States Department of the Interior granted them such recognition on February 10, 1981.

Reservation

The reservation is the location of the tribal government administration, not a residential area. It includes the Jamestown S'Klallam Tribal Center (location of the tribe's administration, natural resources, social and community services departments as well as the Tribal Library and Jamestown Family Dental Clinic), the Tribe's Seven Cedars Casino, Longhouse Market Deli and Fueling Station, Cannabis and natural remedies shop, and newly built resort hotel.

In addition to the small parcel of reservation land, the Tribe also owns more than 1,000 acres of land in Clallam and Jefferson Counties. That land includes Railroad Bridge Park and The Cedars at Dungeness Golf Course in Sequim, and Tamanowas Rock, a sacred S'Klallam site in Chimacum.

Language
The S'Klallam language (called Clallam or Klallam) belongs to the Salishan family of Native American languages. The word S'Klallam means "the strong people."

Tribal government
The community is governed by a democratically elected tribal council. , the tribe had 594 enrolled citizens, and provided services to almost 640 Indians in the northeast Olympic Peninsula.

Mission statement
The tribal mission statement reads:
The Jamestown S'Klallam Tribe seeks to be self-sufficient and to provide quality governmental programs and services to address the unique social, cultural, natural resource and economic needs of our people. These programs and services must be managed while preserving, restoring and sustaining our Indian heritage and community continuity.

Tribal council
The Tribe is governed by the five-member Jamestown S'Klallam Tribal Council. Council members are elected on a staggered basis by the registered adult tribal members for two-year terms. The council acts in accordance with the Jamestown S'Klallam Tribal Constitution and is led by the Tribal Chairman.

Native American Advocacy 
On April 4, 2014, the Bureau of Indian Affairs, part of the department of the interior, approved the Jamestown S'Klallam Tribe leasing regulations under the HEARTH Act after testimony from the Tribal Chairman, W. Ron Allen. With this approval, the Tribe is authorized to enter into the following type of leases without BIA approval: Business leases. This has allowed the tribe to expand their business ventures for the welfare of the members with the prosperity and benefits of a casino, golf course, medical and dental facilities, and other small enterprises.

The Jamestown S'Klallam Tribe is also heavily involved in protecting and preserving their ancestral lands. Their natural resources department works to reach all parts of the diverse Pacific Northwestern ecosystem, but is mainly focused on the Dungeness River watershed. Headed primarily by their Dungeness River Management Team, the tribe has been involved in the completion of over 40 watershed planning documents, studies, and recovery plans since 1989.

Notes

References
Jamestown S'Klallam Tribe homepage, www.jamestowntribe.org (retrieved July 12, 2006)
Joseph H. Stauss. The Jamestown S'Klallam Story: Rebuilding a Northwest Coast Indian Tribe. Sequim, Washington: Jamestown S'Kallam, December 2002. .
Jamestown S'Klallam Reservation and Off-Reservation Trust Land, Washington United States Census Bureau

Further reading
Stauss, Joseph H. The Jamestown S'Klallam Story: Rebuilding a Northwest coast Indian tribe (Jamestown S'Klallam, 2002) 
Worley, Joan, editor Totem Poles of the Jamestown S'Klallam Tribe (Jamestown S'Klallam Tribe, 2007)

External links
Jamestown S'Klallam Tribe, official website
Jamestown S'Klallam history and culture page
University of Washington Libraries Digital Collections – The Pacific Northwest Olympic Peninsula Community Museum A web-based museum showcasing aspects of the rich history and culture of Washington State's Olympic Peninsula communities.

Klallam
Native American tribes in Washington (state)
Federally recognized tribes in the United States
Clallam County, Washington